Survision is a Venezuelan community television channel.  It was created in September 2004 and can be seen in the community of Canagua in the Arzobispo Chacon Municipality of the Mérida State of Venezuela on UHF channel 64.  Marco Antonio Torres is the legal representative of the foundation that owns this channel.

As of now, Survision does not have a website.

See also
List of Venezuelan television channels

Television networks in Venezuela
Television stations in Venezuela
Mass media in Mérida, Mérida
Television channels and stations established in 2004
Spanish language
2004 establishments in Venezuela
Television in Venezuela
Spanish-language television stations